Hawks State Forest is a state forest in Carroll County, Virginia.  It offers watershed protection and wildlife habitat.

References
Virginia State Forests website

Virginia state forests
Protected areas of Carroll County, Virginia
1996 establishments in Virginia
[[Category:Protected areas established in 1996]